East Carolina University is home to sixteen social fraternities, ten social sororities, five historically African-American fraternities, and four historically African-American sororities. There are also sixteen honor fraternities, and twelve service or religious fraternities/sororities.

Social fraternities and sororities

Interfraternity Council 
The sixteen active and seven inactive/suspended social fraternities include:
ActiveAlpha Sigma Phi (ΑΣΦ) Founded on 8 December 1979 and Rechartered on 26 October 2013
ActiveAlpha Tau Omega (ΑΤΩ) Founded on 27 October 2012
ActiveBeta Theta Pi (ΒΘΠ) Founded in 1982
ActiveChi Phi (ΧΦ) Founded in 1999
SuspendedDelta Chi (ΔΧ) Founded in November 1992 (closed in 2018)
ActiveDelta Sigma Phi (ΔΣΦ) Founded on 23 April 1971
ActiveDelta Tau Delta (ΔΤΔ) Founded Fall 2021
ActiveKappa Alpha Order (ΚΑ) Founded on 26 September 1958
ActiveKappa Sigma (ΚΣ) Founded November 20, 1966 (closed 2014) Rechartered 2017
ActiveLambda Chi Alpha (ΛΧΑ) Founded 1959 (closed 2010) Rechartered 2020
ActivePhi Gamma Delta (ΦΓΔ- FIJI) Founded on 27 February 2009
SuspendedPhi Kappa Psi (ΦΚΨ) Founded on 26 October 1991 (closed in 2021)
SuspendedPhi Kappa Tau (ΦΚΤ) Founded in 1962 (closed in 2018)
SuspendedPi Kappa Alpha (ΠΚΑ) Founded on 17 May 1958 (closed in 2019)
SuspendedPi Kappa Phi (ΠΚΦ) Founded on 6 February 1963 (closed in 2019)
ActivePi Lambda Phi (ΠΛΦ) Founded 1972 Rechartered 2018
SuspendedSigma Alpha Epsilon (ΣΑΕ) Founded on 9 November 1996 (closed in 2018)
SuspendedSigma Phi Epsilon (ΣΦΕ) Founded on 4 April 1964 (closed in 2017)
ActiveSigma Nu (ΣΝ) Founded on January 1, 1956 and Rechartered August 2017
ActiveSigma Pi (ΣΠ) Founded on 21 April 1990 and Rechartered 2015
ActiveSigma Tau Gamma (ΣΤΓ) Founded April 14, 1978 Rechartered 11 November 2011
ActiveTau Kappa Epsilon (ΤΚΕ) Founded on 6 May 1968 (closed in 2018, rechartered 2022)
ActiveTheta Chi (ΘΧ) Founded on 15 March 1958 and Rechartered on 1 October 1988

Panhellenic Council 
The eleven social sororities include:
Alpha Delta Pi (ΑΔΠ) Founded on 5 February 1960
Alpha Gamma Delta (ΑΓΔ) Founded on 23 September 2017
Alpha Phi (ΑΦ) Founded on 6 February 1960 (closed in 2018, Rechartering Fall 2022)
Alpha Omicron Pi (ΑΟΠ) Founded on February 6, 1960
Alpha Xi Delta (ΑΞΔ) Founded in 1960
Chi Omega (ΧΩ) Founded in 1960
Delta Zeta (ΔΖ) Founded in 1960
Kappa Delta (ΚΔ) Founded 6 February 1960 and Recolonized in 2001
Phi Mu (ΦΜ) Founded in 2013
Sigma Sigma Sigma (ΣΣΣ) Founded in 1960
Zeta Tau Alpha (ΖΤΑ) Founded 27 March 1987

Historically African-American Greek life

National Pan-Hellenic Council

Historically African-American fraternities
The five historically African-American fraternities include:
Alpha Phi Alpha Eta Nu chapter; Founded April 3, 1971
Phi Beta Sigma Xi Nu chapter; Founded on January 29, 1983
Kappa Alpha Psi Eta Psi chapter; Founded on February 23, 1975
Omega Psi Phi Upsilon Zeta chapter
Iota Phi Theta

Historically African-American sororities
The four historically African-American sororities include:
Alpha Kappa Alpha Theta Alpha chapter
Delta Sigma Theta Kappa Sigma chapter; Founded November 10, 1973
Sigma Gamma Rho Eta Mu chapter 
Zeta Phi Beta Lambda Mu chapter; Founded June 4, 1983

Non-Social fraternities and sororities

Business fraternities 
Alpha Kappa Psi - Business fraternity

Music fraternities 
Phi Mu Alpha Sinfonia - Social music fraternity
Sigma Alpha Iota - All female social music fraternity

Honor fraternities 
Alpha Epsilon Delta - National Health Professions Honor Society 
Alpha Kappa Delta - International Sociological Honor Society
Alpha Phi Sigma - Criminal Justice Honorary Organization
Beta Alpha Psi - Accounting Fraternity
Gamma Beta Phi - Honor & Service Organization
Epsilon Tau Pi - Honorary Eagle Scout fraternity
Kappa Omicron Nu - National Family & Consumer Sciences Honor Society 
Omicron Delta Kappa - National Leadership Honor Society 
Order of Omega - Co-Ed honor society that recognizes the top 3% of fraternity/sorority by GPA.
Phi Alpha Theta - History Honor Society
Phi Eta Sigma - Freshman Honors Fraternity
Phi Sigma Pi - Co-ed National Honor Fraternity
Pi Kappa Delta - National Forensic & Communication Arts Honorary Fraternity
Pi Omega Pi - National Business Career and Technology Education Honor Organization
Pi Sigma Alpha - National Political Science Honor Society
Psi Chi - National Psychology Honor Society
Sigma Gamma Epsilon - National Earth Sciences Honor Society
Sigma Tau Delta - International English Honor Society

Service/religious fraternity/sorority 
Alpha Phi Omega - Co-Ed service fraternity
Alpha Lambda Mu - Muslim fraternity
Beta Gamma Psi - Co-Ed service fraternity
Chi Alpha Omega - Christian fraternity
Epsilon Sigma Alpha - Service sorority
Gamma Chi Epsilon - Service sorority
Gamma Sigma Sigma - Service sorority
Kappa Kappa Psi - Band service fraternity
Sigma Alpha Omega - Christian sorority
Sigma Gamma Rho - Service sorority
Theta Nu Xi - International & ethnic minorities service sorority
Tau Beta Sigma - Band service sorority

References

External links
 ECU Greek Life Homepage

East Carolina University
Greenville, North Carolina
East Carolina University